Be Yourself is a Delphic maxim, Σαυτὸν ἴσθι, and may refer to:

Music
"Be Yourself" (Hawkwind song), 1970
"Be Yourself", a Graham Nash song from Songs for Beginners, 1971
"Be Yourself" (Morcheeba song), 2000
"Be Yourself" (Enrique Iglesias song), 2003
"Be Yourself" (Audioslave song), 2005 
Be Yourself (Michael Rose album), 1996
Be Yourself (Patti LaBelle album), 1989
Be Yourself (Carlos Toshiki & Omega Tribe album), 1989
Be Yourself (EP), a 2022 EP by Jay B

Film

Be Yourself!, a 1930 film starring Fanny Brice